Bol-Berim Airport  is a public use airport located near Bol, Lac, Chad.

See also
List of airports in Chad

References

External links 
 Airport record for Bol-Berim Airport at Landings.com

Airports in Chad
Lac Region